The 1986 CA-TennisTrophy was a men's tennis tournament played on indoor hard courts at the Wiener Stadthalle in Vienna, Austria that was part of the 1986 Nabisco Grand Prix. The tournament ran from 20 October until 27 October 1986. First-seeded Brad Gilbert won the singles title.

Finals

Singles

 Brad Gilbert defeated  Karel Nováček 3–6, 6–3, 7–5, 6–0
 It was Gilbert's 5th title of the year and the 12th of his career.

Doubles

 Ricardo Acioly' /  Wojciech Fibak defeated  Brad Gilbert /  Slobodan Živojinović by walkover
 It was Acioly's only title of the year and the 1st of his career. It was Fibak's 3rd title of the year and the 65th of his career.

References

External links
 ATP tournament profile
 ITF tournament edition details

 
CA-TennisTrophy
Vienna Open